Senegalia grandisiliqua is a species of plant in the family Fabaceae.

References

grandisiliqua